Enochrus, a genus of water scavenger beetles, is the third-largest genus of hydrophilids with 222 species in six subgenera worldwide.

Subgenera
Enochrus Thomson, 1859
Hocophilydrus Kniz, 1911
Hugoscottia Knisch, 1922
Hydatotrephis MacLeary, 1871
Lumetus Zaitzev, 1908
Methydrus Rey, 1885

Species
These 67 species belong to the genus Enochrus:

 Enochrus aequalis (Sharp, 1882) i c g
 Enochrus affinis (Thunberg, 1794) g
 Enochrus aridus Gundersen, 1977 i c g
 Enochrus ater (Kuwert, 1888) g
 Enochrus bartletti Short, 2004 g
 Enochrus bicolor (Fabricius, 1792) g
 Enochrus blatchleyi (Fall, 1924) i c g b
 Enochrus calabricus (Ferro, 1986) g
 Enochrus californicus (Horn, 1890) i c g b
 Enochrus carinatus (LeConte, 1855) i c g
 Enochrus cinctus (Say, 1824) i c g b
 Enochrus coarctatus (Gredler, 1863) g
 Enochrus concii Chiesa, 1965 g
 Enochrus consors (Leconte, 1863) i c g b
 Enochrus consortus Green, 1946 i c g b
 Enochrus cristatus (LeConte, 1855) i c g
 Enochrus cuspidatus (LeConte, 1878) i c g
 Enochrus darwini (Knisch, 1922) i c g
 Enochrus debilis (Sharp, 1882) i c
 Enochrus diffusus (LeConte, 1855) i c g b
 Enochrus elongatulus (MacLeay, 1871) g
 Enochrus esuriens (Walker, 1858) g
 Enochrus falcarius Hebauer, 1991 g
 Enochrus fimbriatus (Melsheimer, 1844) i c g
 Enochrus flavicans g
 Enochrus fragiloides d'Orchymont, 1925 g
 Enochrus fuscipennis (Thomson, 1884) g
 Enochrus grossi Short, 2003 i c g
 Enochrus halophilus (Bedel, 1878) g
 Enochrus hamifer (Ganglbauer, 1901) g
 Enochrus hamiltoni (Horn, 1890) i c g b
 Enochrus hispanicus (Kuwert, 1888) g
 Enochrus interruptus Gundersen, 1977 i c g
 Enochrus maculiceps (MacLeay, 1871) g
 Enochrus malabarensis (Régimbart, 1903) g
 Enochrus mauritiensis (Régimbart, 1903) g
 Enochrus melanocephalus (Olivier, 1792) i c g
 Enochrus mexicanus (Sharp, 1882) i c
 Enochrus morenae (Heyden, 1870) g
 Enochrus natalensis (Gemminger & Harold, 1868) g
 Enochrus negrus Gundersen, 1977 i c g
 Enochrus nigritus (Sharp, 1872) g
 Enochrus obscurus (Sharp, 1882) i c
 Enochrus ochraceus (Melsheimer, 1844) i c g b
 Enochrus ochropterus (Marsham, 1802) g
 Enochrus parumstriatus Hebauer, 2005 g
 Enochrus piceus Miller, 1964 i c g
 Enochrus plicatus g
 Enochrus politus (Küster, 1849) g
 Enochrus pygmaeus (Fabricius, 1792) i c g b
 Enochrus quadripunctatus (Herbst, 1797) g
 Enochrus ragusae (Kuwert, 1888) g
 Enochrus reflexipennis (Zimmermann, 1869) i c g
 Enochrus sagrae Knisch, 1924 i c g
 Enochrus salomonis (J.Sahlberg, 1900) g
 Enochrus sauteri Orchymont, 1913 g
 Enochrus sayi Gundersen, 1977 i c g b
 Enochrus segmentinotatus (Kuwert, 1888) g
 Enochrus simulans (Sharp, 1873) g
 Enochrus spangleri g
 Enochrus sublongus (Fall, 1926) i c g
 Enochrus subsignatus (Harold, 1877) g
 Enochrus talamanca g
 Enochrus testaceus (Fabricius, 1801) g
 Enochrus tritus (Broun, 1880) g
 Enochrus variegatus Steinheil, 1869 g
 Enochrus vulgaris Steinheil, 1869 g

Data sources: i = ITIS, c = Catalogue of Life, g = GBIF, b = Bugguide.net

References

External links

 

Hydrophilidae genera
Hydrophilinae